Simon Nye (born 29 July 1958) is an English screenwriter, best known for television comedy. He wrote the hit sitcom Men Behaving Badly, and all of the four ITV Pantos. He co-wrote the 2006 film Flushed Away, created an adaptation of Richmal Crompton's Just William books in 2010, and wrote the drama series The Durrells.

Early life
Nye was born in Burgess Hill, Sussex. Nye was educated at Collyer's School and Bedford College, University of London, where he studied French and German.

He started his writing career as a translator, publishing translations of books on Richard Wagner, Henri Matisse and Georges Braque, before turning his hand to novel writing in 1989, with Men Behaving Badly. This was followed in 1991 by Wideboy, which he later adapted into the TV show Frank Stubbs Promotes.

Career

Men Behaving Badly
Nye's TV writing career began in 1990 when he was persuaded by producer Beryl Vertue to adapt his first novel for the small screen. The first two series of Men Behaving Badly were broadcast on ITV in 1992. The show soon went on to achieve critical and commercial success, winning the Writers' Guild of Great Britain Award for Best Situation Comedy in 1995, and the Royal Television Society Award for Best Situation Comedy/Comedy Drama in 1996. The show became the most-repeated comedy show in the 1990s.

Nye also appeared in the show, briefly playing a prospective tenant in the episode "Gary and Tony". He also played one of Gary's friends, Clive, in the episode where Gary and Dorothy plan to get married.

Other work
Though best known for sitcoms – such as Is It Legal? (starring Imelda Staunton), How Do You Want Me? (starring Charlotte Coleman and Dylan Moran), Hardware (starring Martin Freeman) and Carrie and Barry (a semi-sequel to Men Behaving Badly starring Neil Morrissey as a matured Tony in all but name) – he has also written comedy dramas such as Frank Stubbs Promotes (1993–1994), as well as literary adaptations such as The Railway Children (2000). In addition, he has written a number of comic adaptations of pantomimes including Jack and the Beanstalk (25 December 1998), Cinderella (2 January 2000), Aladdin (25 December 2000), and Dick Whittington (1 January 2002). He also wrote the short-lived 2001 sitcom The Savages, and contributed an episode to the 2010 series of Doctor Who, titled "Amy's Choice."

Nye also continues to write translations, focusing in recent years on dramatic works. His translation of Molière's Don Juan was first performed at the Crucible Theatre in Sheffield in 2001, and his translation of Dario Fo's Accidental Death of an Anarchist premiered at the Donmar Warehouse in London in 2003. He also wrote a pilot episode Felix and Murdo, which starred Alexander Armstrong and Ben Miller.

He wrote the screenplay for the 2005 BBC (British Broadcasting Corporation) of My Family And Other Animals based on Gerald Durrell's Corfu Trilogy. In 2016, Nye wrote ITV's The Durrells, another adaptation of the trilogy, starring Keeley Hawes as Louisa Durrell.

Filmography

Bibliography

Novels
 Wideboy (1991) 
 Men Behaving Badly (1989)

Translations
 Accidental Death of an Anarchist (2003) 
 Matisse: The Graphic Work (1988) 
 Georges Braque: Life and Work (1988) 
 Vienna Opera (1987)

References

External links
 
 Simon Nye entry on the BBC Comedy Guide
 Interview with Simon Nye
 Nobleman Behaving Badly (Guardian profile)

1958 births
Living people
Alumni of Royal Holloway, University of London
People educated at The College of Richard Collyer
People from Burgess Hill
British television writers
British science fiction writers
English dramatists and playwrights
English male dramatists and playwrights
English television writers
English male screenwriters
British male television writers
20th-century English screenwriters
20th-century English male writers
21st-century British screenwriters
21st-century English male writers